A projective vector field (projective) is a smooth vector field on a semi Riemannian manifold (p.ex. spacetime)  whose flow preserves the geodesic structure of  without necessarily preserving the affine parameter of any geodesic.  More intuitively, the flow of the projective maps geodesics smoothly into geodesics without preserving the affine parameter.

Decomposition

In dealing with a vector field  on a semi Riemannian manifold (p.ex. in general relativity), it is often useful to decompose the covariant derivative into its symmetric and skew-symmetric parts:

where 

 

and 

Equivalent conditions

Mathematically, the condition for a vector field  to be projective is equivalent to the existence of a one-form  satisfying

which is equivalent to 

(For non-connected manifolds you need to specify these 3 in one point per connected component.) Projectives also satisfy the properties:

Subalgebras

These subalgebras are useful, for example, in classifying spacetimes in general relativity.

Affine algebra

Affine vector fields (affines) satisfy  (equivalently) and hence every affine is a projective. Affines preserve the geodesic structure of the semi Riem. manifold (read spacetime) whilst also preserving the affine parameter. Affines also preserve the Riemann, Ricci and Weyl tensors, i.e. 

Homothetic algebra

Homothetic vector fields (homotheties) preserve the metric up to a constant factor, i.e. .

. 

A homothetic vector field is uniquely determined by specifying the values of the vector field and its first covariant derivative (equivalently, specifying ,  and ) at any point of the manifold.

Killing algebra

Killing vector fields (Killings) preserve the metric, i.e. .

. 

Applications
In general relativity, many spacetimes possess certain symmetries that can be characterised by vector fields on the spacetime. For example, Minkowski space  admits the maximal projective algebra, i.e. . 

Many other applications of symmetry vector fields in general relativity may be found in Hall (2004) which also contains an extensive bibliography including many research papers in the field of symmetries in general relativity.

References
 
 
 

Differential geometry